Boller and Chivens was an American manufacturer of high-quality telescopes and spectrographs headquartered in South Pasadena, California.

History
Founded about 1946 by Harry Berthold Boller (1915-1997) and Clyde Cuthbertson Chivens (1915-2008). the company was acquired in 1965 by Perkin-Elmer.

In the 1950s, Boller and Chivens collaborated with Perkin-Elmer to develop and manufacture the large-aperture Baker-Nunn satellite tracking camera for the United States Vanguard space satellite program.

In culture
A 41-cm (16-inch) Boller and Chivens Cassegrain reflector originally housed at the Harvard-Smithsonian Oak Ridge Observatory in Massachusetts is available for public use at the National Air and Space Museum's Public Observatory Project on the National Mall in Washington, D.C.

Notes and references

External links
www.bollerandchivens.com: a site by former employee Don Winans documenting the products made by Boller and Chivens. (Accessed 23 January 2012.)
Blog posting asking help identifying details of Boller and Chivens image collection, March 12, 2009.
Boller and Chivens image directory

American companies established in 1946
Technology companies disestablished in 1965
Defunct technology companies of the United States
Telescope manufacturers
Instrument-making corporations
South Pasadena, California
1940s establishments in California
1965 disestablishments in California
1965 mergers and acquisitions
Technology companies established in 1946
Defunct manufacturing companies based in California